Toroca is one of the cantons of the Ravelo Municipality, the second municipal section of the Chayanta Province in the Potosí Department in Bolivia. During the census of 2001 it had 1,636 inhabitants.  Its seat is Toroca, a small village with a population of 20 in 2001.

References

External links
Ravelo Municipality: population data and map

Cantons of Potosí Department
Cantons of Bolivia